Hewitsoniella migonitis is a species of butterfly in the family Hesperiidae. It is found in New Guinea.

External links
Insects of Papua New Guinea

Trapezitinae
Butterflies described in 1876
Taxa named by William Chapman Hewitson